Acanthocephalus may refer to:
Acanthocephalus (worm), a genus of parasitic worms
Acanthocephalus (plant), a genus of flowering plants in the family Asteraceae